Mount Rose Ski Tahoe is a ski resort in the western United States, in the Sierra Nevada mountains near Reno, Nevada.

Despite the name, the resort is actually on the slopes of Slide Mountain rather than Mount Rose, which is on the other side of Nevada State Route 431.

It opened  in 1953 as the "Reno Ski Bowl" on the east face of Slide Mountain. The inaugural NCAA Skiing Championships were held there in March 1954, hosted by the University of Nevada, with the downhill won by Wolf Pack senior Pat Meyers. Later renamed to the "Slide Mountain Ski Area", it operated side-by-side with the "Mount Rose Ski Area", which opened in 1964 on the mountain's north side; the two areas merged in 1987.

December 2004 saw the opening of The Chutes at Mount Rose, which offer some of the steepest, consistent terrain in all of Tahoe.

In 2018, the Buser family (majority shareholders since 1972) decided to keep the resort, after having it on the market.

Winters Creek Lodge
Winters Creek Lodge is Mt. Rose's newly built facility on the "Slide" side. It accommodates up to 200 guests indoors, with seating for 115, and 58 at the bar. Outdoor events can accommodate up to 400 seated on their  deck. It is named for Winters Creek which flows east from Slide Mountain to Lake Washoe.

References

Websites
 

Sierra Nevada (United States)
Ski areas and resorts in Nevada
Buildings and structures in Washoe County, Nevada
Tourist attractions in Washoe County, Nevada